Timothy Paul Dellor is a radio presenter on BBC Radio.

Biography 
Born in Reading, Berkshire in 1975 to Ralph Dellor and his wife, he grew up in Woolhampton, Berkshire, and attended Bradfield College. Dellor graduated from the University of Gloucestershire with a bachelor's degree in Sport and Exercise Science and Geography and from the London Institute with a master's degree in Broadcast Journalism.

He is now a Level 4 ECB-qualified coach, making him one of the most highly qualified cricket coaches at the ECB, and used to coach Berkshire Minor County Cricket first team and was once head of their Elite Player programme. He was also head coach to the Greece national cricket team for 9 years, winning the ECC Trophy in 1999.

Dellor is also a sports commentator and reporter with the BBC.

He works for BBC Local Radio, BBC South TV and Five Live, commentating on horse racing and international rowing. He won a Gold Frank Gillard Award for his coverage of the 2012 Olympic Games. He is regarded as one of the leading sports radio commentators in the UK.

Dellor has run the London Marathon on three occasions. He played Minor County Cricket and was captain of Berkshire age group teams up to U19 level.

Dellor's position as Reading Football commentator gives him a huge amount of leverage over Reading FC. He was connected to the sacking of Brendan Rodgers as it was felt by some fans that the manager's outburst on air and rudeness to Dellor may have been indicative of his imminent dismissal.

Personal life 
Dellor married Amanda Sutton at St Bartholomew's church in Nettlebed, Oxfordshire in December 2005. Sutton is a BBC Berkshire broadcast journalist,  who often wrote sports reports on Reading Hockey Club. They had worked closely together in November 2004 covering the Ufton Nervet rail crash.

References

External links
 Tim Dellor ECC Coach Profile at cricketeurope.net
 https://www.bbc.co.uk/programmes/p00wnmd1 Weekend Kick-Off] (BBC Radio Berkshire) 
 Tim Dellor on Ufton Nervet rail crash (BBC Radio Berkshire)

British radio personalities
Sports commentators
1975 births
Living people
People from Reading, Berkshire
People educated at Bradfield College
Alumni of the University of Gloucestershire